Peter Alexander Hay (1866–1952) R.I., R.S.W., R.B.C. was a Scottish genre, still-life, portrait and landscape watercolourist. His work was part of the painting event in the art competition at the 1932 Summer Olympics.

References

1866 births
1952 deaths
Scottish watercolourists
Scottish portrait painters
20th-century Scottish painters
Scottish male painters
Olympic competitors in art competitions
20th-century Scottish male artists